John L. Schnase is an American computer scientist, whose work on the life history of Cassin's sparrow (Peucaea cassinii) resulted in an early application of computers in avian energetics modeling, currently at NASA, and an Elected Fellow of the American Association for the Advancement of Science. He's the author of the long-running science blog CassinsSparrow.org that explores the history of Cassin's Sparrow's discovery, what we've learned about the species since, and why it matters.

References

Year of birth missing (living people)
Living people
Fellows of the American Association for the Advancement of Science
American computer scientists